Kaiserslautern is an electoral constituency (German: Wahlkreis) represented in the Bundestag. It elects one member via first-past-the-post voting. Under the current constituency numbering system, it is designated as constituency 209. It is located in southern Rhineland-Palatinate, comprising the city of Kaiserslautern, the Donnersbergkreis district, the Kusel district, and the northeastern part of the Landkreis Kaiserslautern district.

Kaiserslautern was created for the inaugural 1949 federal election. Since 2023, it has been represented by Matthias Mieves of the Social Democratic Party (SPD).

Geography
Kaiserslautern is located in southern Rhineland-Palatinate. As of the 2021 federal election, it comprises the independent city of Kaiserslautern, the district of Donnersbergkreis, the district of Donnersbergkreis, and the Verbandsgemeinden of Enkenbach-Alsenborn, Otterbach-Otterberg, and Weilerbach.

History
Kaiserslautern was created in 1949. In the 1949 election, it was Rhineland-Palatinate constituency 13 in the numbering system. In the 1953 through 1961 elections, it was number 160. In the 1965 through 1976 elections, it was number 161. In the 1980 through 1998 elections, it was number 159. In the 2002 election, it was number 212. In the 2005 election, it was number 211. In the 2009 and 2013 elections, it was number 210. Since the 2017 election, it has been number 209.

Originally, the constituency comprised the city of Kaiserslautern and the districts of Landkreis Kaiserslautern and Kusel. It acquired its current borders in the 2002 election.

Members
The constituency has been held by the Social Democratic Party (SPD) during all but two Bundestag terms since its creation. It was first represented by Adolf Ludwig of the SPD from 1949 to 1953. August Spies of the Christian Democratic Union (CDU) was elected in 1953 and served until 1961. Adolf Müller-Emmert regained it for the SPD in 1961 and was representative until 1987, a total of seven consecutive terms. He was succeeded by Rose Götte from 1987 to 1994. Hansjörg Schäfer then served two terms from 1994 to 2002. Gustav Herzog was representative from 2002 to 2021. He was succeeded by Matthias Mieves in 2021.

Election results

2021 election

2017 election

2013 election

2009 election

References

Federal electoral districts in Rhineland-Palatinate
1949 establishments in West Germany
Constituencies established in 1949
Kaiserslautern
Donnersbergkreis
Kusel (district)
Kaiserslautern (district)